The 1966–67 season was the 65th in the history of the Western Football League.

The champions for the third time in their history, and the third season in succession, were Welton Rovers.

Final table
The league was increased from 18 clubs to 21 with three new clubs joining:

Plymouth Argyle Colts
St Luke's College
Yeovil Town Reserves, rejoining the league after leaving in 1965.

References

1966-67
5